Father Knows Less may refer to:
 "Father Knows Less" (Boy Meets World), an episode of Boy Meets World
 "Father Knows Less" (Parker Lewis Can't Lose), an episode of Parker Lewis Can't Lose

See also
Father Knows Best (disambiguation)